Trichordestra legitima, the striped garden caterpillar, is a moth of the family Noctuidae. The species was first described by Augustus Radcliffe Grote in 1864. It is found in eastern North America, from Newfoundland to Florida, west to Texas, north to Saskatchewan.

The wingspan is 25–39 mm. Adults are on wing from June to September. There is one generation per year.

The larvae feed on wide range of woody and herbaceous plants, including asparagus, aster, bean, broomrape, cherry, clover, dogbane, goldenrod, grasses, milkweed, mustard, pea, pokeweed, raspberry, tobacco, violet, willow and yarrow. Preferred hosts include various slender grasses, including Muhlenbergia and Agrostis.

External links

Hadeninae
Moths of North America